Palestine is an unincorporated community in Wirt County, West Virginia, United States. Its ZIP code is 26160. The community was named after Palestine.

Prior to 1905, the name of Palestine's post office was Reedy Ripple, to distinguish its name from a community named "Palatine" in Marion County; the name "Reedy Ripple" derived from an accumulation of gravel in the Little Kanawha River at the mouth of Reedy Creek.  Palestine gained notice in 2003 for being the hometown of Jessica Lynch.

The Buffalo Church near Palestine was listed on the National Register of Historic Places in 1990.

References

Unincorporated communities in Wirt County, West Virginia
Unincorporated communities in West Virginia
Little Kanawha River